Wifey is a 1978 American novel written by Judy Blume.

Plot
The story follows the life of bored 1970s New Jersey housewife, Sandy Pressman, who decides to reinvigorate her life by having an extramarital affair with an old high school boyfriend. This decision is complicated when she accidentally discovers evidence her husband might be having a long-term affair. Somewhat emblematic of the time period of open marriages and different mores, this was the first novel by Blume to directly address adult lives and sexuality.

Author's commentary
"My first novel for adult readers! Funny and baaad, Sandy Pressman was raised to lead a fifties life. You know... grow up, get a college degree in case, god forbid, you ever have to go to work, marry well, have children and....that's the problem...and what??? For Sandy, it's the summer she begins to question her choices and give in to her fantasies.

"When Wifey was published some people thought I would never write another children's book, some thought I had written a real book at last, some were angry that I hadn't used a pseudonym, others that I even had such thoughts! Plus, I began to hear from old boyfriends. And those who wanted to be."

References

External links
Judy Blume's website 

1978 American novels
Adultery in novels
G. P. Putnam's Sons books
Novels by Judy Blume
Novels set in New Jersey